James Vibert   (15 August 1872 in Carouge, Geneva – 2 May 1942, Plan-les-Ouates)  was a Swiss sculptor and educator. He is known as one of the precursors of the Symbolism movement in Switzerland.

Biography
Vibert was educated as an ironworker in Lyon and moved to Paris in 1891, where he joined the atelier of Rodin and where he associated himself with  French Symbolism. 

His former students included Pierre Le Faguays.

Ferdinand Hodler painted two portraits of Vibert, one in 1907 and the other in 1915.  The 1907 portrait is on display at The Art Institute of Chicago as part of the Helen Birch Bartlett Memorial Collection.

References

P.-E. Vibert, La vie et l'oeuvre de James Vibert (obituary with 36 reproductions), Geneva, 1942.
Charles Baudouin, James Vibert, vol. 4 of Artistes romands contemporains, Editions des Nouveaux Cahiers, 1943.
Louis Avennier, James Vibert, statuaire, S. A. des Éditions Sonor, 1922.

Swiss sculptors
Symbolist sculptors
1872 births
1942 deaths
20th-century sculptors
People from Carouge